The Korba-Visakhapatnam Express is a daily train in India that runs between Korba in Chhattisgarh and Visakhapatnam in Andhra Pradesh, travelling through much of Odisha. It began to operate in 1989. The route is 731 km long and passes through 31 stations.

Schedule 
The express service departs from Korba (KRBA) at 16:30 every evening, it reaches Visakhapatnam (VSKP) the following morning at 07:50. The 18518 service departs Visakhapatnam at 20:00 and reaches Korba at 11:00 the next morning. 
This train passes through many important industrial centres and cities like bilaspur, raipur, Rayagada, Vizianagaram, Simhachalam.

The route operates year-round.

Stops
 Visakhapatnam
 Simhachalam
 Vizianagaram
 Bobbili
 Parvatipuram
 Parvatipuram Town
 Rayagada
 Kesinga
 Titlagarh
 Kantabanji
 Harishanker Road
 Khariar Road
 Bagbahra
 Mahasamund
 Raipur
 Tilda Neora
 Bhatapara
 Bilaspur
 Akaltara
 Janjgir Naila
 Champa
 Korba

Locomotion 
It is hauled by WAP-7 of Lallaguda loco shed or WAP-7 of Bhilai loco shed between Korba  and Raipur and by Visakhapatnam WAP-4 locomotive from Raipur to Visakhapatnam.

References

Transport in Korba, Chhattisgarh
Transport in Visakhapatnam
Express trains in India
Rail transport in Chhattisgarh
Rail transport in Odisha
Rail transport in Andhra Pradesh